Legacy Silverton Medical Center, known as Silverton Hospital before its affiliation with Legacy Health System in 2016, is a nonprofit regional hospital located in Silverton, Oregon, United States. Founded in 1917, the 48-bed facility moved to its current location in 1938. The hospital includes a Level IV trauma center, a 24-hour emergency department, a family birth center, and diagnostic imaging.

Services

Legacy Silverton Medical Center offers a comprehensive mix of services, many of which are not typically available in a small rural hospital, including:

 Diagnostic imaging
 Family birth center
 Foot care clinic
 General surgery
 Lab services
 Nutrition services
 Orthopedic/sports medicine
 Primary care
 Women's health
 Wound care & infusion services

Awards and recognition

Since 2008, Legacy Silverton has earned recognition each year with the Press Ganey Summit Award, which is given to hospitals ranked in the top 5 percent for clinical performance and patient satisfaction.

Controversies
The hospital reported in January 2015 that ten patients had been burned during surgeries due to unfiltered halogen lights in the operating room.

References

External links 
 Silverton Hospital homepage
 

Silverton, Oregon
Hospitals in Oregon
Hospital buildings completed in 1938
Buildings and structures in Marion County, Oregon
Hospitals established in 1917
1917 establishments in Oregon
Legacy Health